The Right Stuff is a dating app for American conservatives. It was founded by John McEntee, Daniel Huff and Isaac Stalzer and is funded by tech billionaire Peter Thiel.

History 
The Right Stuff was founded by former Trump White House aides John McEntee and Daniel Huff, and Trump Administration appointee Isaac Stalzer. In 2021, McEntee met with Peter Thiel to pitch him on The Right Stuff. Thiel agreed to fund The Right Stuff and subsequently made a seed round investment of $1.5 million. The New York Times reported in February 2022 that Thiel was funding the app as part of a larger effort to also finance "hard-right" political candidates with Trumpian views.

The company is based in Brea, California. The Right Stuff is part of a larger trend among conservatives to create alternatives to a media culture they see as dominated by the political left.

The app was launched on September 30, 2022. The Daily Beast reported that it generated 6,000 and 7,000 downloads in its first two days on the Apple App Store, before falling to 1,000 per day between October 8 and 10.

Marketing 
The Right Stuff's marketing is targeted towards young conservatives primarily living in large, progressive cities. Its tagline is "A dating app for the right wing" and "Profiles without Pronouns." A promotional video featuring Ryann McEnany, the sister of former White House press secretary Kayleigh McEnany, was released in August 2022.

Reception 
The app received mainly negative reviews from users, with a 2.4 star rating in the Apple App Store as of October 4. Criticism was directed at the app's invite-only model, a lack of female users and the company's slowness in approving new user profiles, as well as a prompt reading "January 6 was..."; some users said that the FBI contacted them after they answered the prompt. A spokesperson for The Right Stuff told The Independent that it had determined the reports of FBI contact were false, and attributed them to "people trolling".

See also 

 Comparison of online dating services
 Timeline of online dating services

References

External links 

 

Geosocial networking
Mobile social software
Online dating applications
Online dating services of the United States
Proprietary cross-platform software
Computer-related introductions in 2022